Barzago is a comune (municipality) in the Province of Lecco in the Italian region Lombardy, located about  northeast of Milan and about  southwest of Lecco.

Barzago borders the following municipalities: Barzanò, Bulciago, Castello di Brianza, Cremella, Dolzago, Garbagnate Monastero, Sirone, Sirtori.

References

External links
 Official website

Cities and towns in Lombardy